The Continental Ranges is a major grouping of mountain ranges in the Rocky Mountains located in eastern British Columbia and western Alberta.  It is a physiographic designation for use by geologists and is not used by the general public; it is not recognized in Alberta, and does not appear on topographic maps, although the names of its subranges (the Kootenay, Park or Main Ranges, and Front Ranges) are in common use.  It is the largest and best-known of the three main such subdivisions of the Canadian Rockies, the others being the Hart Ranges and the Muskwa Ranges.

Sub-ranges

There are three main subdivisions of the Continental Ranges: the Front Ranges, the Park Ranges, and the Kootenay Ranges.  Each of those three subdivisions is further divided into individual ranges as follows:

Front Ranges
Bare Range
Bighorn Range
Bosche Range
De Smet Range
Elk Range
Fairholme Range
First Range
Fisher Range
Goat Range
Greenhills Range
High Rock Range
Highwood Range
Jacques Range
Kananaskis Range
Lizard Range
Maligne Range
Miette Range
Murchison Group
Nikanassin Range
Opal Range
Palliser Range
Queen Elizabeth Ranges
Ram Range
Sawback Range
Slate Range
Taylor Range
Vermilion Range
Victoria Cross Ranges
Whitegoat Peaks
Wisukitsak Range
Park Ranges, also known as the Main Ranges.
Blackwater Range
Blue Range
Bow Range
Chaba Icefield
Clemenceau-Chaba
Columbia Icefield
Drummond Group
Freshfields
Harrison Group
Hooker Icefield
Kitchen Range
Le Grand Brazeau
McKale-Chalco Divide
Mitchell Range
Morkill Ranges
Ottertail Range
Rainbow Range
Royal Group
Selwyn Range
Spray Mountains
Sundance Range
The Ramparts
Trident Range
Van Horne Range
Vermilion Range
Wapta Icefield
Waputik Icefield
Waputik Mountains
President Range
Winston Churchill Range
Kootenay Ranges
Beaverfoot Range
Brisco Range
Hughes Range
Stanford Range
Van Nostrand Range

References

Mountain ranges of British Columbia
Ranges of the Canadian Rockies